is a Japanese professional baseball infielder for the Yokohama DeNA BayStars in Nippon Professional Baseball(NPB).

On November 16, 2018, he was selected Yomiuri Giants roster at the 2018 MLB Japan All-Star Series exhibition game against MLB All-Stars.

His elder brother Kosuke is also a professional baseball player currently playing for Hiroshima Toyo Carp.

References

External links

NPB.com

1993 births
Living people
Japanese baseball players
Nippon Professional Baseball second basemen
Nippon Professional Baseball third basemen
Baseball people from Kanagawa Prefecture
Yomiuri Giants players
Yokohama DeNA BayStars players